A nerve sheath tumor is a type of tumor of the nervous system (nervous system neoplasm) which is made up primarily of the myelin surrounding nerves. From benign tumors like schwannoma to high grade malignant neoplasms known as malignant peripheral nerve sheath tumors, peripheral nerve sheath tumors include a range of clearly characterized clinicopathologic entities.
A peripheral nerve sheath tumor (PNST) is a nerve sheath tumor in the peripheral nervous system. Benign peripheral nerve sheath tumors include schwannomas and neurofibromas.

A malignant peripheral nerve sheath tumor (MPNST) is a cancerous peripheral nerve sheath tumor, which are frequently resistant to conventional treatments.

Origin of peripheral nerve sheath tumors
The primary Schwann cell differentiation and neoplastic proliferations are characteristics of peripheral nerve sheath tumors. For instance, the Schwann cell, which is the major neoplastic cell component of neurofibroma, is cytologically distinguished by the expression of S-100 protein and wavy nuclear outlines. A variety of peripheral nerve cells, including axons, perineurial cells, fibroblasts, and varying inflammatory components such as mast cells and lymphocytes, are also present in neurofibromas. A population of CD34-positive cells with an unknown histogenesis is also found.

References

External links 

Nervous system neoplasia